Manitowish Waters Airport  is a town owned public use airport located one mile (1.6 km) south of the central business district of Manitowish Waters, a town in Vilas County, Wisconsin, United States. It is included in the National Plan of Integrated Airport Systems for 2021–2025, which categorized it as a local general aviation facility.

Although most U.S. airports use the same three-letter location identifier for the FAA and IATA, this airport is assigned D25 by the FAA but has no designation from the IATA.

Facilities and aircraft 
Manitowish Waters Airport covers an area of 439 acres (177 ha) at an elevation of 1,610 feet (491 m) above mean sea level. It has two runways: 14/32 is 3,498 by 60 feet (1,066 x 18 m) with an asphalt surface and 4/22 is 3,094 by 120 feet (943 x 36 m) with a turf surface.

For the 12-month period ending August 12, 2021, the airport had 6,200 aircraft operations, an average of 17 per day: 97% general aviation and 3% air taxi.
In February 2023, there were 12 aircraft based at this airport: all 12 single-engine.

See also
List of airports in Wisconsin

References

External links 
 Airport page at Manitowish Waters website
 

Airports in Wisconsin
Buildings and structures in Vilas County, Wisconsin